The 1966 Humboldt State Lumberjacks football team represented Humboldt State College during the 1966 NCAA College Division football season. Humboldt State competed in the Far Western Conference (FWC).

The 1966 Lumberjacks were led by first-year head coach Bud Van Deren. They played home games at the Redwood Bowl in Arcata, California. Humboldt State finished with a record of four wins and six losses (4–6, 2–4 FWC). The Lumberjacks were outscored by their opponents 144–210 for the season.

Schedule

Notes

References

Humboldt State
Humboldt State Lumberjacks football seasons
Humboldt State Lumberjacks football